The 2011 Copa Constitució was the nineteenth season of Andorra's football knockout tournament. The competition will begin on 16 January 2011 with the matches of the first elimination round and ended on 22 May 2011 with the Final. UE Sant Julià were the defending champions. The winners will earn a place in the second qualifying round of the 2011–12 UEFA Europa League.

Results

First elimination round
This round will be entered by the top eight from the ten 2010–11 Segona Divisió teams at the time of the mid-season break: Lusitanos B, FC Rànger's, FC Santa Coloma B, UE Engordany, UE Extremenya, Atlètic Club d'Escaldes, Penya Encarnada d'Andorra, and Principat B. The matches will be played on 16 January 2011.

|}

Second elimination round
The teams from 2010–11 Primera Divisió placed fifth to eighth after 12 rounds played – CE Principat, Inter Club d'Escaldes, Casa Estrella del Benfica, and FC Encamp – enter in this round and will join the winners of the first elimination round. For each match, one Segona Divisió and one Primera Divisió team have been drawn together. The matches will be played on 23 January 2011.

|}

Third elimination round
The winners from the previous round will compete in this round together with the teams from Primera Divisió placed first to fourth after 12 rounds played – Lusitanos, UE Sant Julià, FC Santa Coloma, and UE Santa Coloma. The first legs will be played on 17 April 2011 while the second legs took place on 24 April 2011.

|}

Semifinals
The first legs will be played on 8 May 2011 while the second legs took place on 15 May 2011.

|}

Final

External links
 Official site 
 Copa Constitució on rsssf.com

Copa Constitució seasons
Andorra
Copa